The Auron is a  long river in central France, a left tributary of the river Yèvre. Its source is near the village of Valigny, west of Lurcy-Lévis. The Auron flows generally northwest through the following towns, all in the department of Cher: Bannegon, Dun-sur-Auron, Saint-Just, Plaimpied-Givaudins and Bourges.

The Auron flows into the Yèvre at Bourges. For much of its length, it runs parallel to the disused Canal de Berry.

References

External links
Description of the confluence with the Yèvre 

Rivers of France
Rivers of Centre-Val de Loire
Rivers of Cher (department)